Alfredo Encalada (born 4 September 1957) is an Ecuadorian footballer. He played in two matches for the Ecuador national football team in 1983. He was also part of Ecuador's squad for the 1983 Copa América tournament.

References

1957 births
Living people
Ecuadorian footballers
Ecuador international footballers
Association football defenders
Sportspeople from Guayaquil
S.D. Quito managers